Mearajuddin Ahmad was a 19th-century Bengali academic, writer, and Islamic scholar.

Early life
Ahmad was born in Satkhira District, Khulna Division, Bengal Presidency, British Raj. He was fluent in Bengali and Urdu languages.

Career
Ahmad translated Urdu-language articles into Bengali for the Sudhakar magazine. In 1885 he wrote Tuhfatul Moslemin with Muhammad Reazuddin Ahmad. He was the professor of Arabic and Persian languages at the St Xavier's College in Kolkata. In 1890 he wrote Dharmayuddha Ba Jihad O Samaj Samskar, about Jihad and social welfare, in collaboration with Sheikh Abdur Rahim. In the book he wrote that the Muslims of India should not revolt against the British colonial government because they protected freedom of religion of the Muslims. The Dhaka Mussalman Suhrid Sammilani, a pro-women's education movement, asked him to write a book for young girls. He wrote Tuhfatul Moslemin for them. He also taught Persian language at the Doveton College, Calcutta.

Legacy
Ahmad was an influential figure in the Muslim literary society of Kolkata. In 1890, Mohammad Mozammel Huq, the poet, dedicated his book, Ferdousi Charita, to Ahmad.

References

19th-century Muslim scholars of Islam
Bengali Muslim scholars of Islam
People from Satkhira District
19th-century Bengalis